Psychedelic metal may refer to:

Stoner rock
Palm Desert Scene
Psychedelic rock
Psychedelia